Travis Williams (January 14, 1946 – February 17, 1991) was an American football player for the Green Bay Packers. Williams attended Harry Ells High School, Contra Costa College and Arizona State University, before being selected in the 1967 NFL Draft at the insistence of Packers' coach Vince Lombardi. He returned four kickoffs for touchdowns in his rookie season in 1967, setting an NFL record. Among the returns were two in one quarter against the Cleveland Browns to set another league record. He also set the record for single-season kickoff return average with 41.06 yards, returning 18 kickoffs for 739 yards, helping the Packers win their second consecutive Super Bowl championship (Super Bowl II). 

Williams played four seasons with the Packers and two with the Los Angeles Rams, before a knee injury ended his career prematurely in the 1972 season.  He was traded to the Rams along with the Packers' 4th round draft pick in 1971 in exchange for the Rams' 2nd round pick in 1971 (used to select Virgil Robinson) and a 1972 draft pick.  Williams finished his career with 4,778 all-purpose yards and 18 touchdowns, 7 of which came on special teams returns.  He averaged 16.4 yards per punt return and 27.5 yards per kick return.  In his final season, he led the league in yards per kick return, averaging 29.7.

After his playing career was over, Williams worked a series of odd jobs, collecting junk, driving trucks, working as a bouncer and as a security guard.  Later in life, he suffered from alcoholism, particularly after his wife died of a drug overdose in 1985.  He was often homeless, sometimes sleeping out of his car.  In 1988, he was arrested at a demonstration in front of the office of senator Alan Cranston, protesting cuts to public housing projects.

Williams died of heart failure on February 17, 1991, at the age of 45.

References

External links
 Green Bay Packers website
Contra Costa College Top 50 Athletes of All-Time
NY Times, Williams died
" Ex-Packer Williams Dead at 45 : Football: He set kick-return record in 1967 but battled homelessness and alcoholism after his career ended," L.A. Times Archives, Feb. 19, 1991, Associated Press 
"The Last Return; After running back kicks in the NFL, Travis Williams ran into homelessness and a tragic ending" by Bruce Newman, Sports Illustrated, March 11, 1991

1946 births
1991 deaths
American football return specialists
American football running backs
Green Bay Packers players
Los Angeles Rams players
Contra Costa Comets football players
Arizona State Sun Devils football players
People from El Dorado, Arkansas
Players of American football from Arkansas
Sportspeople from Richmond, California